The men's 10 kilometre classical cross-country skiing competition at the 1994 Winter Olympics in Lillehammer, Norway, was held on 17 February at Birkebeineren Ski Stadium in Lillehammer.

Each skier started at half a minute intervals, skiing the entire 10 kilometre course. The Norwegian Sture Sivertsen was the 1993 World champion. Men's 10 kilometre classical was not a part of the 1988 Winter Olympics in Calgary, Canada.

Results

References

External links
 Final results (International Ski Federation)

Men's cross-country skiing at the 1994 Winter Olympics
Men's 10 kilometre cross-country skiing at the Winter Olympics